Epidendrum bambusiforme  (bamboo shaped Epidendrum) is a species of orchid in the genus Epidendrum.

bambusiforme